Roman Sergeyevich Tuzovskiy (born 3 January 1985) is a Russian former professional football player.

Club career
He played 5 seasons in the Russian Football National League for 4 different clubs.

External links
 
 

1985 births
Sportspeople from Barnaul
Living people
Russian footballers
Association football midfielders
FC Rotor Volgograd players
FC Fakel Voronezh players
FC Dynamo Barnaul players
FC Volgar Astrakhan players
FC Sodovik Sterlitamak players
FC Mordovia Saransk players
FC Novokuznetsk players
FC Volga Ulyanovsk players